Dean Peterson may refer to:

 Dean Peterson (American football) (born 1949), head football coach for the Frostburg State University Bobcats
 Dean Peterson (ice hockey) (born 1988), Australian ice hockey player
 Dean M. Peterson (1931–2004), American inventor
 Dean Bobby Peterson, a character who appeared in The Simpsons episodes "Homer Goes to College" and "Faith Off”.